Wolfgang Stefinger (born 20 April 1985) is a German politician of the Christian Social Union (CSU) who has been serving as a member of the Bundestag from the state of Bavaria since 2013.

Political career 
Stefinger first became a member of the Bundestag in the 2013 German federal election. He is a member of the Committee on Education, Research and Technology Assessment and the Committee on Economic Cooperation and Development. In this capacity, he is his parliamentary group's rapporteur for relations with India.

In addition to his committee assignments, Stefinger serves as deputy chairman of the German Parliamentary Friendship Group for Relations with the Southern African States. 

In the negotiations to form a fourth coalition government under Chancellor Angela Merkel following the 2017 federal elections, Stefinger was part of the working group on education policy, led by Annegret Kramp-Karrenbauer, Stefan Müller and Hubertus Heil.

Other activities 
 German Africa Foundation, Member of the Board (since 2022)
 Baker Tilly Foundation, Member of the Advisory Board
 Federal Agency for Civic Education (BPB), Member of the Board of Trustees 
 St Barbara Foundation, Member of the Board of Trustees

Political positions 
In June 2017, Stefinger voted against his parliamentary group’s majority and in favor of Germany’s introduction of same-sex marriage.

Controversy
Amid the COVID-19 pandemic in Germany in 2020, Stefinger was one of three members of his parliamentary group – alongside Ronja Kemmer and Christoph Ploß – who became the subject of media scrutiny after they had accepted an invitation to embark on a three-day short trip to Oman; Oman's embassy covered their travel expenses of 5,466 euros each.

Personal life
Stefinger has been in a relationship with fellow politician Sepp Müller since 2022.

References

External links 

  
 Bundestag biography 

1985 births
Living people
Members of the Bundestag for Bavaria
Members of the Bundestag 2021–2025
Members of the Bundestag 2017–2021
Members of the Bundestag 2013–2017
Politicians from Munich
Members of the Bundestag for the Christian Social Union in Bavaria
LGBT conservatism
LGBT members of the Bundestag
German LGBT politicians